Soci may refer to several places in Romania:

 Soci, a village in Pâncești commune, Bacău County
 Soci, a village in Miroslovești commune, Iași County
 Soci, a village in Borca commune, Neamț County
 Soci, a village in Ștefan cel Mare commune, Neamț County
 Soci, a village in Gherghești commune, Vaslui County
 Soci (river), a tributary of the Siret in Bacău County

See also
Sochi, a city in Krasnodar Krai, Russia